Kyra Elzy (born August 17, 1978) is the head coach of the Kentucky Wildcats women's basketball team.  On December 14, 2020, after starting the season 6-0 and having a top-ten AP ranking, AD Mitch Barnhart removed the "interim" tag and made Elzy the head coach.

College career 
Elzy attended Tennessee between 1996 and 2001, sitting out the 1998 – 99 season due to an injury. Under acclaimed coach Pat Summitt, she was a member of the teams that won the national championship in 1997 and 1998, as well as the team that finished as the national runner-up in 2000. She was named the winner of the Holly Warlick defensive player of the year award in 1997.

Head coaching record

References

External links
Kentucky Wildcats Coaching bio

1978 births
Living people
Kansas Jayhawks women's basketball coaches
Kentucky Wildcats women's basketball coaches
Oldham County High School alumni
Tennessee Lady Volunteers basketball coaches
Tennessee Lady Volunteers basketball players
Western Kentucky Lady Toppers basketball coaches
American women's basketball players